Les Monts d'Andaine is a commune in the department of Orne, northwestern France. The municipality was established on 1 January 2016 by merger of the former communes of Saint-Maurice-du-Désert and La Sauvagère (the seat).

See also 
Communes of the Orne department

References 

Communes of Orne
Populated places established in 2016
2016 establishments in France